The 2013–14 season of the Frauen-Bundesliga was the 24th season of Germany's premier women's football league. The season began on 7 September 2013 and concluded on 8 June 2014. VfL Wolfsburg defended their title.

On the last matchday 12,464 spectators watched the title-deciding match of Wolfsburg against Frankfurt, setting a new Bundesliga record. Frankfurt, undefeated this season so far, only needed a draw to capture the title. They lost 1–2 and thus Wolfsburg won the championship, while Wolfsburg never was top off the table before the last matchday.

Teams
The teams promoted from the previous 2. Bundesliga season were TSG Hoffenheim as winners of the Southern division and BV Cloppenburg as winners of the Northern division. VfL Sindelfingen held their place in the league following the bankruptcy of SC 07 Bad Neuenahr, who were instead relegated last season.  On 1 January 2014, FCR 2001 Duisburg became the women's section of MSV Duisburg and play under that name.

Broadcast
Starting this season Eurosport bought the rights to televise one match every matchday. The first match was Wolfsburg against Bayern on 7 September 2013. It was the first time the Bundesliga played an opening match. The same match is also streamed per DFB-TV over the internet, a long established service.

League table

Results

Top scorers
As of 8 June 2014

References

External links
News, Matchdetails, Teams, Transfers on weltfussball.de
Season on dfb.de

2013-14
Ger
Women1
1